The Emergency Medical Treatment and Active Labor Act (EMTALA) is an act of the United States Congress, passed in 1986 as part of the Consolidated Omnibus Budget Reconciliation Act (COBRA). It requires hospital emergency departments that accept payments from Medicare to provide an appropriate medical screening examination (MSE) to anyone seeking treatment for a medical condition, regardless of citizenship, legal status, or ability to pay. Participating hospitals may not transfer or discharge patients needing emergency treatment except with the informed consent or stabilization of the patient or when their condition requires transfer to a hospital better equipped to administer the treatment.

EMTALA applies to "participating hospitals." The statute defines participating hospitals as those that accept payment from the Department of Health and Human Services, Centers for Medicare and Medicaid Services (CMS) under the Medicare program. Because there are very few hospitals that do not accept Medicare, the law applies to nearly all hospitals. The combined payments of Medicare and Medicaid, $602 billion in 2004, or roughly 44% of all medical expenditures in the U.S., make not participating in EMTALA impractical for nearly all hospitals. EMTALA's provisions apply to all patients, not just to Medicare patients.

The cost of emergency care required by EMTALA is not directly covered by the federal government, so it has been characterized as an unfunded mandate. Uncompensated care represents 6% of total hospital costs.

Mandated and non-mandated care
Congress passed EMTALA to eliminate the practice of "patient dumping", i.e., refusal to treat people because of inability to pay or insufficient insurance, or transferring or discharging emergency patients on the basis of high anticipated diagnosis and treatment costs. The law applies when an individual seeks treatment for a medical condition "or a request is made on the individual's behalf for examination or treatment for that medical condition."

The U.S. government defines an emergency department as "a specially equipped and staffed area of the hospital used a significant portion of the time for initial evaluation and treatment of outpatients for emergency medical conditions." This means, for example, that outpatient clinics not equipped to handle medical emergencies are not obligated under EMTALA and can simply refer patients to a nearby emergency department for care.

An emergency medical condition (EMC) is defined as "a condition manifesting itself by acute symptoms of sufficient severity (including severe pain) such that the absence of immediate medical attention could reasonably be expected to result in placing the individual's health [or the health of an unborn child] in serious jeopardy, serious impairment to bodily functions, or serious dysfunction of bodily organs." For example, a pregnant woman with an emergency condition and/or currently in labor must be treated until delivery is complete, the mother and fetus are stabilized, or a qualified personnel identifies the labor as a "false labor", or Braxton Hicks contractions, unless a transfer under the statute is appropriate.

Patients treated under EMTALA may not be able to pay or have insurance or other programs pay for the associated costs but are legally responsible for any costs incurred as a result of their care under civil law.

Non-covered medical conditions
Not all medical conditions qualify for uncompensated mandated services imposed by EMTALA, which is contrary to the misperception that many individuals assume that if they are ill, they will be treated, regardless of their ability to pay.

The sole purpose for the EMTALA mandated MSE is to require emergency departments to make a determination whether an emergency medical condition does or does not exist, using their normal assessment and diagnostic protocols.   Since the MSE is a mandated EMTALA service, health insurers are required to cover benefits for their subscribers.  They are also required to cover EMTALA mandated services necessary to stabilize individuals determined to have an EMC.

EMTALA intentionally omitted any requirement for hospitals to provide uncompensated stabilizing treatment for individuals with medical conditions determined not to be an EMC.  Therefore, such individuals are not eligible for further uncompensated examination and treatment beyond the MSE.

A significant portion of emergency department visits are considered not to be EMCs as defined by EMTALA.  The medical profession refers to these cases as "non-emergent". Regardless, this term is not recognized by the law as a condition defined by the EMTALA statute.  A term more relevant for compliance with EMTALA is "non-emergency medical condition".  If this "non-emergent" term is used in the context of EMTALA, it needs to be defined as medical conditions that fail to pass the criteria for determination of being a true EMC as defined by EMTALA statute.

Admitted patients who experience a medical emergency while at the hospital are normally not covered by EMTALA, but are instead protected by varying state laws and quality assurance under the deemed status of the facility.

Hospital obligations
Hospitals have three obligations under EMTALA:
 Individuals requesting emergency care, or those for whom a representative has made a request if the patient is unable to do so, must receive a medical screening examination (MSE) to determine whether an emergency medical condition (EMC) exists. The participating hospital cannot delay examination and treatment to inquire about methods of payment or insurance coverage, or a patient's citizenship or legal status. The hospital may start the process of payment inquiry and billing only once they have ensured that doing so will not interfere with or otherwise compromise patient care.
 When an emergency department determines that an individual has an EMC, the hospital must provide further treatment and examination until the EMC is resolved or stabilized and the patient can provide self-care following discharge, or if unable to do so, can receive needed continual care. Inpatient care provided must be at an equal level for all patients, regardless of ability to pay. Hospitals cannot discharge a patient prior to stabilization if the patient's insurance is canceled or otherwise discontinues payment during course of stay.
 If the hospital does not have the capability to treat the condition, the hospital must make an "appropriate" transfer of the patient to another hospital with such capability. That includes a long-term care or rehabilitation facilities for patients unable to provide self-care. Hospitals with specialized capabilities must accept such transfers and may not discharge a patient until the condition is resolved and the patient is able to provide self-care or is transferred to another facility. Hospitals have no obligation under EMTALA to provide uncompensated services beyond the screening exam unless it determines that the patient has an emergency medical condition.

Amendments

Since its original passage, Congress has passed several amendments to the act. Additionally, state and local laws in some places have imposed additional requirements on hospitals. These amendments include the following:
 A patient is defined as "stable", therefore ending a hospital's EMTALA obligations, if:
 The patient is conscious, alert, and oriented.
 The cause of all symptoms reported by the patient or representative, and all potentially life-threatening, limb-threatening, or organ-threatening symptoms discovered by hospital staff, has been ascertained to the best of the hospital's ability.
 Any conditions that are immediately life-threatening, limb-threatening, or organ-threatening have been treated to the best of the hospital's ability to ensure the patient does not need further inpatient care.
 The patient is able to care for himself or herself, with or without special equipment, which if needed, must be provided. The required abilities are:
 Breathing
 Feeding
 Mobility
 Dressing
 Personal hygiene
 Toileting
 Medicating
 Communication
 Another competent person is available and able to meet the patient's needs following discharge.
 All patients have EMTALA rights equally, regardless of age, race, religion, nationality, ethnicity, residence, citizenship, or legal status. If patient's status is found to be illegal, hospitals may not discharge a patient prior to completion of care, but law enforcement and hospital security may take necessary actions to prevent a patient from escaping or harming others. Treatment may be delayed as needed only to prevent patients from harming themselves or others.
 Overloaded hospitals may not discharge a patient unable to pay to make room for a patient who is able to pay or is otherwise viewed by society as a more valued citizen. If the emergency department is overloaded, patients must be treated in an order based on their determined medical needs, not their ability to pay.
 Hospitals may not deny or provide substandard services to a patient who already has outstanding debt to the hospital and may not withhold the patient's belongings, records, or other required services until the patient pays.
 Hospitals and related services cannot receive a judgment against the patient in court filings made more than 36 months after the date the patient was discharged or the last partial payment the patient made to the hospital, contractor, or agent. After that period, the patient may not be threatened with legal action if payment is not made and may not be denied future outpatient services from the same company/agency that a patient is able to pay.
 If a patient has been awarded monetary damages against the hospital or any related or affiliated services by a court of law or has settled out of court on damages, the hospital and related/affiliated services may neither withhold money for lack of payment nor count the money toward the bill in lieu of making payment to the patient. Voluntary consent for such an arrangement is permitted only if initiated by the patient. Hospitals may not threaten or coerce a patient into such a settlement or mislead the patient into believing such an arrangement is required or recommended.
 Patients cannot face criminal prosecution for failure to pay even if the patient comes aware of inability to pay to the hospital. Hospitals and third-party agents may not threaten patients with prosecution as a means of scaring the patient into making payment. Patient can be prosecuted under existing federal, state, or local laws for providing false name, address, or other information to avoid payment, receive bills, or to hide fugitive status.
 A hospital cannot delay treatment while determining whether someone can pay or is insured but that does not mean they are completely forbidden from asking or running a credit check. If the patient fails to pay the bill, the hospital can sue the patient and the unsatisfied judgment will likely appear on the patient's credit report. A third-party collector for a hospital bill would be covered under the Fair Debt Collection Practices Act.
 Hospitals are prohibited from discriminating against or providing substandard care to those who appear impoverished or homeless, are not well-dressed or groomed, or exhibit signs of mental illness or intoxication. If the hospital fears that a patient may be a threat to others, the hospital may delay care only as necessary to protect others.
 Hospitals are required to sufficiently feed patients unable to pay at a level equal to those able to pay, while meeting all physician-ordered dietary restrictions.
 Hospitals are not required to provide premium services to the patient not related to medical care (such as television) when failure to provide that service does not compromise patient care.
 Hospitals and affiliated clinics may avoid providing continued outpatient care, drugs, or other supplies after discharge. If such services are recommended but a patient is unable to pay, the hospital is required to refer the patient to a clinic or tax-funded or private program that enables the patient to pay for such services and to which the patient has reasonable access. Hospitals must reasonably assist patients as necessary to obtain such services by providing information as the patient requests.

Effects

Improved health services for uninsured
The most significant effect is that, regardless of insurance status, participating hospitals are prohibited from denying a MSE to individuals seeking treatment for a medical condition. Currently EMTALA only requires that hospitals stabilize the EMC. According to some analyses of the U.S. health care social safety net, EMTALA is an incomplete and strained program.

Cost pressures on hospitals
According to the Centers for Medicare & Medicaid Services, 55% of U.S. emergency care now goes uncompensated.  When medical bills go unpaid, health care providers must either shift the costs onto those who can pay or go uncompensated. In the first decade of EMTALA, such cost-shifting amounted to a hidden tax levied by providers. For example, it has been estimated that this cost shifting amounted to $455 per individual or $1,186 per family in California each year.

However, because of the recent influence of managed care and other cost control initiatives by insurance companies, hospitals are less able to shift costs, and end up writing off more in uncompensated care. The amount of uncompensated care delivered by non-federal community hospitals grew from $6.1 billion in 1983 to $40.7 billion in 2004, according to a 2004 report from the Kaiser Commission on Medicaid and the Uninsured, but it is unclear what percentage of this was emergency care and therefore attributable to EMTALA.

Financial pressures on hospitals in the 20 years since EMTALA's passage have caused them to consolidate and close facilities, contributing to emergency department overcrowding. According to the Institute of Medicine, between 1993 and 2003, emergency departments visits in the U.S. grew by 26 percent, while in the same period, the number of emergency departments declined by 425. Ambulance are frequently diverted from overcrowded emergency departments to other hospitals that may be farther away. In 2003, ambulances were diverted over a half a million times, not necessarily due to patients' inability to pay.

Emergency abortions
After Roe v. Wade was overturned in June 2022, transforming the legal landscape for abortion in the United States, the HHS clarified that EMTALA protections for clinicians apply regardless of state laws.

See also
 Health care in the United States

Notes and references

External links
 CMS EMTALA overview from hhs.gov
 State Operations Manual from hhs.gov
 EMTALA: Its Application to Newborn Infants, by Thaddeus M. Pope, ABA Health eSource, Vol. 4, No. 7 (March 2008)

1986 in American law
99th United States Congress
Medicare and Medicaid (United States)
Emergency medical services in the United States
United States federal health legislation